Ice Rain is a 2004 South Korean romance drama film starring Lee Sung-jae, Song Seung-heon and Kim Ha-neul. Co-written and directed by first-time director Kim Eun-sook, it tells the story of two mountaineers stranded on a climb to Mount Asiaq in Alaska. While waiting out the storm, they share stories of the women that changed their lives, not knowing how closely connected they actually are.

Cast
 Lee Sung-jae as Kang Joong-hyun
 Song Seung-heon as Han Woo-sung
 Kim Ha-neul as Kim Kyung-min 
 Yoo Hae-jin as Park In-soo 
 Kim Jung-hak as Choi Keun-ho
 Lee Chun-hee as Choi Byung-hoon
 Kim Jin-yi as Kwon Sang-hee	
 Lee Seung-joon

References

External links 
 
 
 

2004 films
2000s Korean-language films
Mountaineering films
Films set in Alaska
South Korean romantic drama films
2004 romantic drama films
2000s South Korean films